The Best of OMD is a compilation album by English electronic band Orchestral Manoeuvres in the Dark (OMD), released in 1988; marking a decade since the band's beginnings. The record essentially delineates the group's experimental early years from their pop-oriented later work: side one features recordings from 1979 to 1984, while side two is drawn from the group's 1984–1988 efforts.

The album was a worldwide success, becoming a Top 5 hit across Europe and achieving 3× platinum sales in the United Kingdom and gold status in the United States. "Dreaming" was released as a single and made little impact on the UK charts, reaching No. 50, but it was a hit in the US (No. 16), Germany (No. 26) and South Africa (No. 2).

The Best of OMD was named by The Quietus and Classic Pop as one of the best compilation albums in history.

Background
The version of "Electricity" used is the same as the one featured on their debut album (which itself is the band reworking Martin Hannett's original Factory version). The band was originally going to use their very first version of this song, but found the drumming to be inferior and so settled for the remix of the track instead. "Messages" is the more popular 10" single version; "Tesla Girls" is a compilation version not previously released; and "Talking Loud and Clear" is the 7" edited version.

The worldwide CD, MiniDisc and DCC versions of the album are resequenced and feature four extra tracks not present on the LP version: "Telegraph" (a unique mix found only on this release, differing from the album version and both 12" versions), "Genetic Engineering", and 12" versions of "La Femme Accident" and "We Love You". The US CD adds only the latter two 12" versions. The Australian version of the vinyl album replaces "Secret" with "We Love You", since that song had been a popular hit there. There was also a video compilation released with the promo videos of some of the songs featured on the album.

The Best of OMD was the group's final album release of the decade, effectively closing a chapter on their history as co-founder Paul Humphreys left the following year. According to the band, they had no interest in releasing a hits compilation and did so in order to pay off seemingly inexplicable debts owed to Virgin Records.

Reception

Max Bell of Number One wrote, "Every song seems to be a classic in its own right... [The Best of OMD] is a timely reminder of just how good pop music can be." Robert K. Oermann noted, "For years, OMD has been pumping out a steady stream of shimmering, shiny dance-pop singles, custom-made for those late nights spent bobbing and weaving to hypnotic rhythms. This [album] contains 14 perfect OMD sonic ripples." Detroit Free Press critic Gary Graff referred to the compilation as a "stellar collection of singles". In mid-1988, The Observer reported that The Best of OMD was the ninth best-selling CD album in Britain for the first half of the year.

In a retrospective review, Mike DeGagne of AllMusic highlighted the band's knack for strong hooks, and described The Best of OMD as an "excellent compilation" from a group who "were responsible for some of the catchiest and brightest synth pop that the '80s had to offer". Trouser Press called the record "a concise recapitulation of the band's artistic development", while Quietus writer Ian Wade dubbed it "one of the greatest singles collections ever". It was ranked 13th in Classic Pops "Top 20 Compilation Albums".

Track listing
All songs written by OMD, except "Locomotion" written by OMD and Gordian Troeller, and "So in Love" written by OMD and Stephen Hague.

Vinyl LP and Music Cassette

Compact Disc, MiniDisc and Digital Compact Cassette

VHS Video

Charts

Weekly charts

Year-end charts

Certifications

Release history

Credits
"Electricity" and "Dreaming" are produced by OMD.
"Messages", "Enola Gay" and "Souvenir" are produced by OMD and Mike Howlett.
"Joan of Arc" and "Maid of Orleans" are produced by OMD and Richard Manwaring.
"Telegraph" and "Genetic Engineering" are produced by OMD and Rhett Davies.
"Tesla Girls", "Locomotion" and "Talking Loud and Clear" are produced by OMD and Brian Tench.
"So in Love", "Secret", "(Forever) Live and Die", "We Love You" and "La Femme Accident" are produced by Stephen Hague.
"If You Leave" is produced by OMD and Tom Lord Alge.

References

External links
 Album lyrics

1988 greatest hits albums
Orchestral Manoeuvres in the Dark albums
Albums produced by Rhett Davies
Albums produced by Mike Howlett
Albums produced by Stephen Hague
Albums produced by Tom Lord-Alge
1988 video albums
Music video compilation albums
Virgin Records video albums
Virgin Records compilation albums